The Mary Star of the Sea High School (Mary Star High) is a private, Roman Catholic high school in San Pedro neighborhood, Los Angeles, California.

The school is operated by Mary Star of the Sea Parish under the supervision of the Department of Catholic Schools of the Archdiocese of Los Angeles. It was named one of the Top 50 Catholic High Schools in America in 2006.

Academics
The following Advance Placement classes are offered: AP Calculus, AP English Literature, AP European History, AP Government, AP Spanish Language, AP Environmental science, AP Physics and AP U.S. History.

History
Mary Star of the Sea was established in 1954 by Mary Star of the Sea Parish. There is also a Mary Star of the Sea elementary in San Pedro, which was founded in 1922.

In 1959, the Archdiocese created a separate boys' high school, Fermin Lasuen High School, and Mary Star of the Sea was transitioned to a girls' school. Fermin Lasuen was closed in 1971, and MSoS once again became coeducational.

The school was originally located on 8th Street and moved to a brand new campus on Taper Avenue in the fall of 2007.

On June 10, 2021, the girls' basketball team captured the school's first CIF-Southern Section sports championship with a 54–50 victory over Agoura of Agoura Hills for the Division 4-AA title in front of a large standing room only crowd at Mary Star High.

Notable alumni (including Fermin Lasuen alumni) 
Neal King, educator, college administrator and psychologist
Haven Moses, professional AFL and NFL American football player
Tim Wrightman, professional NFL and USFL American football player

Notes and references

External links
 School Website

Roman Catholic secondary schools in Los Angeles County, California
Educational institutions established in 1954
San Pedro, Los Angeles
1954 establishments in California
Catholic secondary schools in California